Kalitha Dorothy Fox (1894 – 11 August 1934) was an English composer and writer. Little is known about her, except that she had a viola sonata broadcast from Bournemouth.

Selected works
Chamber music
 Scherzo in C for violin and piano, Op. 4 (published 1910)
 Chant élégiaque for cello and piano, Op. 6 (published 1921)
 Sonata in C minor for viola and piano, Op. 7 (ca. 1925)
 Sonata for violin and piano (published 1931)

Piano
 Affliction: On the Death of My Mother (published 1906); arrangement by L. L.
 Fantasie in C minor, Op. 2 (published 1910)
 Minuet in G minor, Op. 3 (published 1910)
 The Kitten Scherzo, Op. 8 (published 1929)
 Prélude, Op. 9 (1925?)
 Five Pieces, Op. 11 (1925?)

References

1894 births
1934 deaths
20th-century classical composers
Women classical composers
English classical composers
20th-century English composers
20th-century English women musicians
20th-century women composers